Spritzgebäck is a type of German and Alsatian-Mosellan biscuit or cookie made of a rich shortcrust pastry. When made correctly, the cookies are crisp, fragile, somewhat dry, and buttery. The German root verb  is cognate with the English to spurt.  As the name implies, these cookies are made by extruding, or "spurting", the dough with a press fitted with patterned holes (a cookie press) or with a cake decorator, or pastry bag, to which a variety of nozzles may be fitted. In the United States, the name  is often shortened to spritz becoming known as the spritz cookie.

See also
 List of German desserts

References

Alsatian cuisine
German cuisine
German desserts
Christmas in Germany
Biscuits
Christmas food